An education minister (sometimes minister of education) is a position in the governments of some countries responsible for dealing with educational matters. Where known, the government department, ministry, or agency that develops policy and delivers services relating to sports are listed; overseen by and responsible to the education minister. The first such ministry ever is considered to be the Commission of National Education (pl. Komisja Edukacji Narodowej, lt. Edukacinė komisija) founded in 1773 in the Polish–Lithuanian Commonwealth.

Country-related articles and lists
Minister of Education may refer to:

Albania
 Ministry of Education and Sciences (Albania)

Argentina
 Minister of Education (Argentina)

Australia
Minister for Education (Australia)
Develops policy and delivers services via the Department of Education, Employment and Workplace Relations

Bangladesh
Minister of Education
 Responsible for secondary, vocational and tertiary education in Bangladesh.
Ministry of Primary and Mass Education
 Responsible for Primary (Class I-VIII) and Mass (literacy) education in Bangladesh.

Brazil
Minister of Education (Brazil)
Develops policy and delivers services via the Ministry of Education (Brazil)

Brunei
Minister of Education (Brunei)
Develops policy and delivers services via the Ministry of Education (Brunei)

Bhutan
Ministry of Education (Bhutan)

Canada
Minister for Alberta Education
Develops policy and delivers services via Alberta Education
Minister for Education (New Brunswick)
Develops policy and delivers services via the Department of Education (New Brunswick)
Minister of Advanced Education and Skills (Newfoundland and Labrador)
Develops policy and delivers services via the Department of Advanced Education and Skills (Newfoundland and Labrador)
Minister of Education (Nova Scotia)
Develops policy and delivers services via the Nova Scotia Department of Education
Minister of Education (Ontario)
Develops policy and delivers services via the Ministry of Education (Ontario)
Minister for Education, Recreation and Sports (Quebec)
Develops policy and delivers services via the Ministry of Education, Recreation and Sports (Quebec) (
Note: Canada does not have an Education Minister at the federal government level as education is a provincial responsibility.

Chile
Minister of Education (Chile)
Develops policy and delivers services via the Ministry of Education (Chile)

People's Republic of China
Minister of Education of the People's Republic of China
Develops policy and delivers services via the Ministry of Education of the People's Republic of China

Hong Kong
Secretary for Education (Hong Kong)
Develops policy and delivers services via the Education Bureau

Croatia
Minister of Science, Education and Sports (Croatia)
Develops policy and delivers services via the Ministry of Science, Education and Sports (Croatia)

Denmark
Minister of Children and Education (Denmark)
Develops policy and delivers services via the Danish Ministry of Education
Minister for Research, Innovation and Higher Education (Denmark)
Develops policy and delivers services via Universities in Denmark

Egypt
Minister of Education of Egypt
Develops policy and delivers services via the Ministry of Education (Egypt)

Estonia
Minister of Education and Research (Estonia)
Develops policy and delivers services via the Ministry of Education and Research (Estonian: Eesti Vabariigi Haridus- ja Teadusministeerium)

Fiji
Minister for Education, Heritage and Arts (Fiji)
Develops policy and delivers services via the Ministry of Education, Heritage and Arts (Fiji)

Finland
Minister of Education (Finland)

France
Minister of National Education (France)
Develops policy and delivers services via the Ministry of National Education (France)

Germany
Federal Minister of Education and Research (Germany)
Develops policy and delivers services via the Federal Ministry of Education and Research (Germany)

Greece
Minister of Education, Lifelong Learning and Religious Affairs (Greece)
Develops policy and delivers services via the Ministry of Education, Lifelong Learning and Religious Affairs (Greece)

Hungary
Minister of Human Resources of Hungary
Develops policy and delivers services via the Ministry of Human Resources (Hungary)

Iceland
Minister of Education, Science and Culture (Iceland)
Develops policy and delivers services via the Ministry of Education, Science and Culture (Iceland)

Indonesia
Minister of Education, Culture, Research and Technology (Indonesia)
Develops policy and delivers services via the Ministry of Education and Culture (Indonesia)

Iran 

 Ministry of Education
 Ministry of Science, Research and Technology

India
Minister of Education
Develops policy and delivers services via the Ministry of Education (India)

Ireland
Minister for Education
Minister for Further and Higher Education, Research, Innovation and Science

Iraq
Ministry of Education (Iraq)
Ministry of Higher Education and Scientific Research (Iraq)

Isle of Man
Minister for Education and Children (Isle of Man)
Develops policy and delivers services via the Department of Education (Isle of Man)

Israel
Minister of Education (Israel)
Develops policy and delivers services via the Ministry of Education (Israel) (Misrad HaHinukh)

Italy
Minister of Education, University and Research (Italy)

Japan
Minister of Education, Culture, Sports, Science and Technology (Japan)
Develops policy and delivers services via the Ministry of Education, Culture, Sports, Science and Technology

Lithuania
Ministry of Education and Science (Lithuania)

Malaysia
Minister of Education (Malaysia)
Minister of Higher Education (Malaysia)

Marshall Islands
Ministry of Education (Marshall Islands)

Mexico
Secretary of Education (Mexico)
Develops policy and delivers services via the Secretariat of Public Education

Netherlands
Minister of Education, Culture and Science (Netherlands)
State Secretary for Higher Education, Science and Knowledge, Teachers, Culture
Develops policy and delivers services via the Ministry of Education, Culture and Science (Netherlands)

New Zealand
Minister of Education (New Zealand)
Develops policy and delivers services via the Ministry of Education (New Zealand)

North Macedonia
 Ministry of Education and Science

Norway
Minister of Education
Minister of Research and Higher Education
Develops policy and delivers services via the Royal Norwegian Ministry of Education and Research

Pakistan
Minister for Education (Pakistan)
Develops policy and delivers services via the Ministry of Education and Training of Pakistan

Peru
Minister of Education (Peru)
Develops policy and delivers services via the Ministry of Education (Peru)

Philippines
Secretary of Education (Philippines)
Develops policy and delivers services via the Department of Education (Philippines)

Poland
Minister of National Education (Poland)
Develops policy and delivers services via the Ministry of National Education (Poland)
Minister of Science and Higher Education (Poland)
Develops policy and delivers services via the Ministry of Science and Higher Education (Poland)

Portugal
Minister for Education (Portugal)
Develops policy and delivers services via the Ministry of Education (Portugal)
Minister for Science, Technology and Higher Education (Policy)
Develops policy and delivers services via the Ministry of Science, Technology and Higher Education (Portugal)

Romania
Minister of Education, Research, Youth and Sport (Romania)
Develops policy and delivers services via the Ministry of Education, Research, Youth and Sport (Romania)

Singapore
Minister for Education (Singapore)
Develops policy and delivers services via the Ministry of Education (Singapore)

Slovakia
Minister for Education, Science and Sport (Slovakia) Ministry of National Education (Slovakia)

South Africa
Minister of Basic Education (South Africa)
Develops policy and delivers services via the Department of Basic Education (South Africa)
Minister of Higher Education and Training (South Africa)
Develops policy and delivers services via the Department of Higher Education and Training (South Africa)

Spain
Minister of Education (Spain)
Develops policy and delivers services via the Ministry of Education (Spain)

Sri Lanka
Minister of Education (Sri Lanka)
Develops policy and delivers services via the Ministry of Education (Sri Lanka)
Minister of Higher Education (Sri Lanka)
Develops policy and delivers services via the Ministry of Higher Education (Sri Lanka)

Sweden
Minister for Education (Sweden)
Develops policy and delivers services via the Ministry of Education and Research (Sweden)

Switzerland
Member of the Swiss Federal Council and Head of the Department of Home Affairs
Develops policy and delivers services via the Federal Department of Home Affairs (Switzerland)

Thailand
Minister of Education (Thailand)
Develops policy and delivers services via the Ministry of Education (Thailand)

United Kingdom

England
Secretary of State for Education
Develops policy and delivers services via the Department for Education

Northern Ireland
Minister of Education (Northern Ireland)
Develops policy and delivers services via the Department of Education (Northern Ireland) (Ulster Scots: Männystrie o Lear/Depairtment o Leir)
Minister for the Economy (Northern Ireland)
Develops policy, higher and further Education and delivers services via the Department of Economy (Northern Ireland) (Ulster Scots: Depairtment for Employ an Learnin)

Scotland
Cabinet Secretary for Education and Skills
Develops policy and delivers services via the Scottish Government Learning and Justice Directorates

Wales
Minister for Education and Skills
Develops policy and delivers services via the Department for Education and Skills (Wales) (Welsh: Yr Adran Addysg a Sgiliau)

United States
United States Secretary of Education
Develops policy and delivers services via the United States Department of Education

Uruguay
Minister of Education and Culture (Uruguay)
Develops policy and delivers services via the Ministry of Education and Culture (Uruguay)

Vietnam
Minister of Education and Training (Vietnam)
Develops policy and delivers services via the Ministry of Education and Training (Vietnam)

See also 

 Right to science and culture
 Human rights
 Right to education
 Right to an adequate standard of living
 Welfare rights
 Economic, social and cultural rights
 Culture minister
 Cultural genocide
Ministry of Education

 
 
Education